Aydan Özoğuz (born 31 May 1967) is a German politician of the Social Democratic Party (SPD), who has been serving as a Vice-president of the German Bundestag since October 2021. She has been a member of the Bundestag since 2009 and served as deputy chairperson of the party from 2011 until 2017.

In addition to her parliamentary mandate, Özoğuz served as Commissioner for Immigration, Refugees and Integration at the rank of Minister of State in the third government of Chancellor Angela Merkel from 2013 until 2018.

Early life and education 
Özoğuz was born on 31 May 1967 in Finkenau, Hamburg to Turkish parents, who came to Germany in 1958. She grew up in Hamburg-Lokstedt. Her parents later went into their own food business. Özoğuz acquired German citizenship in 1989. She has two brothers, Yavuz and Gürhan.

She finished her high school education at Corvey-Gymnasium in 1986 with Abitur. Following her studies in English as a major and Spanish and Human Resources Management as a minor, she completed a master's degree at the University of Hamburg in 1994. During her university years, she was member of the Turkish Student Society in Hamburg, and served as its chairperson for two years.

Early career
Since 1994, Özoğuz was research fellow in the Körber Foundation as project manager of "Coordination of New Projects" with focus on German-Turkish projects. From 1996 on, Özoğuz conducted projects in the field of Youth and Science Exchange as well as academic conferences on issues of international relations. With her election into Bundestag, she was exempted from her post at the Körber Foundation.

Political career

Career in state politics
Between 2001 and 2008, Özoğuz was member of the State Parliament of Hamburg. She was appointed speaker of the SPD parliamentary group for migration policies and member of the committees of interior affairs, petitions and family.

In 2004, Özoğuz joined the Social Democratic Party of Germany (SPD). She is the first ever Turkish descent woman in the SPD leadership as deputy chairperson.

Member of the Bundestag, 2009–present 
Özoğuz first entered the Bundestag at the 2009 German federal election. She became a member of the Committee on  Family Affairs, Senior Citizens, Women and Youth. She served also in the Committee of Inquiry for internet and the digital society. On 2 March 2010, the SPD parliamentary group appointed her commissioner of the group for integration.

Özoğuz was re-elected in the 2013 election, gaining the constituency of Hamburg-Wandsbek. She is one of the eleven politicians of Turkish descent who won a seat in the Bundestag, including seven women.

Since 2018, Özoğuz has been a member of the Committee on Foreign Affairs and on the Committee on Human Rights and Humanitarian Aid. She also serves as deputy chairwoman of the Subcommittee on Disarmament, Arms Control and Non-Proliferation.

Ahead of the 2021 elections, Özoğuz was elected to lead the SPD campaign in Hamburg. In the negotiations to form a so-called traffic light coalition of the SPD, the Green Party and the Free Democrats (FDP) following the elections, she was part of her party's delegation in the working group on migration and integration, co-chaired by Boris Pistorius, Luise Amtsberg and Joachim Stamp.

Federal Commissioner for Immigration, Refugees and Integration, 2013–2018 
On 16 December 2013, Özoğuz was appointed Commissioner for Immigration, Refugees and Integration in the third Merkel cabinet, succeeding Maria Böhmer (CDU). She was the first ever woman with Turkish roots and Muslim member of the German Federal Government as Minister of State.

In April 2015, Özoğuz accompanied German President Joachim Gauck on a state visit to Turkey. In September 2015, amid the European migrant crisis, she joined Vice Chancellor Sigmar Gabriel on a trip to the Zaatari refugee camp in Jordan to learn more about the plight of Syrians fleeing from Syrian civil war which erupted in 2011.

Together with Doris Ahnen, Niels Annen, Michael Groschek and Manuela Schwesig, Özoğuz co-chaired the SPD's 2017 extraordinary convention in Dortmund.

In the negotiations to form a fourth coalition government under Chancellor Angela Merkel following the 2017 federal elections, Özoğuz was part of the working group on migration policy, led by Volker Bouffier, Joachim Herrmann and Ralf Stegner.

Political positions

Domestic policy 
In May 2017, Özoğuz wrote a guest commentary in the newspaper Tagesspiegel in which she stated that a specific German culture "aside from the language is simply not identifiable", as "already historically, rather regional cultures, immigration and diversity have shaped our history". She added that "Globalisation and pluralisation of lifeworlds leads to a further diversification of diversity."

Human rights 
In August 2012, Özoğuz was one of 124 members of the Bundestag to sign a letter that was sent to the Russian ambassador to Germany, Vladimir Grinin, expressing concern over the trial against the three members of Pussy Riot. "Being held in detention for months and the threat of lengthy punishment are draconian and disproportionate," the lawmakers said in the letter. "In a secular and pluralist state, peaceful artistic acts – even if they can be seen as provocative – must not lead to the accusation of serious criminal acts that lead to lengthy prison terms."

Other activities 
 Tarabya Cultural Academy, Member of the Advisory Board (since 2022)
 Islamkolleg Deutschland (IKD), Member of the Board of Trustees (since 2021)
 Aktion Deutschland Hilft (Germany's Relief Coalition), Member of the Board of Trustees (since 2019)
 Avicenna-Studienwerk, Member of the Board of Trustees
 Berghof Foundation, Member of the Advisory Council
 Charta der Vielfalt, Ex-officio Member of the Board
 Friedrich Ebert Foundation (FES), Member of the Board of Trustees
 Forum gegen Rassismus, Ex-officio Member of the Board
 German Association for Public and Private Welfare, Ex-officio Member of the Central Committee
 German Foundation of School Sports, Ex-officio Member of the Board of Trustees
 German Historical Museum, Deputy Member of the Board of the Trustees (since 2010)
 Foundation for History of Federal Republic of Germany, Deputy Member of the Board of the Trustees.
 German Committee of Youth For Understanding, Member of the Board of Trustees
 German-Palestinian Society, Member of the advisory board (since 2018)
 Hamburg Foundation for Migrants, Member of the Advisory Board
 Muslim Academy in Germany(), Member of the Board of Trustees
 Stiftung Lesen, Member of the Board of Trustees
 Urban Future Forum, Member of the Board of Trustees
 Bündnis für Demokratie und Toleranz, Ex-officio Member of the advisory board (2013–2018)
 Civis Media Prize, Ex-officio Member of the Board of Trustees (2013–2018)
 German Institute for Human Rights (DIMR), Ex-officio Member of the Board of Trustees (2013–2018)
 Deutschlandstiftung Integration, Ex-officio Member of the Board (2013–2018)
 Norddeutscher Rundfunk, Member of the Broadcasting Board (2009–2013)
 Islamisches Wissenschafts- und Bildungsinstitut, Member of the Board of Trustees (2004–2009)
 BürgerStiftung Hamburg, Member of the Board of Trustees (2006–2009)

Personal life 
Özoğuz is married to Michael Neumann, Senator of Interior Affairs from SPD in the state government of Hamburg, and has a daughter, Hanna.

Her brothers Yavuz Özoğuz and Gürhan Özoğuz, both staunch and avowed admirers of the Islamic Republic of Iran and Hizballah, run the Islamist internet site Muslim-Markt. Aydan Özoğuz distanced herself from her brothers on their radical Islamist viewpoints in a newspaper interview in October 2011.

Her twin cousins Hakan Özoğuz and Gökhan Özoğuz are part of the ska punk band Athena from Istanbul, Turkey.

References

External links

1967 births
Living people
Women members of State Parliaments in Germany
Members of the Bundestag for Hamburg
German Shia Muslims
Members of the Hamburg Parliament
German politicians of Turkish descent
Naturalized citizens of Germany
21st-century German women politicians
University of Hamburg alumni
Members of the Bundestag 2021–2025
Members of the Bundestag 2017–2021
Members of the Bundestag 2013–2017
Members of the Bundestag 2009–2013
Members of the Bundestag for the Social Democratic Party of Germany
Recipients of the Cross of the Order of Merit of the Federal Republic of Germany